Armstrong is an unincorporated community in central Kenedy County, Texas, United States. As of 2014, it consisted solely of a small rural post office, with no habitations; an extensive, gated ranch land abuts its lone building, which lies on U.S. Route 77 approximately twenty miles south of Sarita across the highway from the Missouri Pacific Railroad's tracks.

See also
Kingsville micropolitan area

References

External links

Unincorporated communities in Texas
Unincorporated communities in Kenedy County, Texas
Kingsville, Texas micropolitan area